The 1934–35 Illinois Fighting Illini men's basketball team represented the University of Illinois.

Regular season
The 1934-35 season brought the fourth conference title at the University of Illinois as well as the second title in Craig Ruby's tenure. Ruby had previously won a title in his second season, 1923-24.  A new star on the playing floor emerged during the 1934-35 season with the addition of Harry Combes to the roster. Combes, a three-year letterwinner, starred for the Illini from 1935–37 and later returned to his alma mater as head coach of the Illini in 1948. Combes helped lead Illinois to both its Big Ten titles in the 1930s. Along with future head coach Combes the Illini only returned 6 lettermen from a team that had finished in fourth place in the Big Ten the year before.  Even though the Fighting Illini lost twice to Indiana, they improved in conference play by finishing with a record of 9 wins and 3 losses. The team finished the season with an overall record of 15 wins 5 losses with one of the losses coming as the result of playing two games on December 10, 1934.  The starting lineup included captain Frank Froschauer and Roy Guttschow at forward, Harry Combes, Jack Benyon and Wilbur Henry at guard, with Lewis Dehner at the center position.

Roster

Source

Schedule

|-	
!colspan=12 style="background:#DF4E38; color:white;"| Non-Conference regular season

|- align="center" bgcolor=""

|-	
!colspan=9 style="background:#DF4E38; color:#FFFFFF;"|Big Ten regular season

Bold Italic connotes conference game
												
Source

Awards and honors

References

Illinois Fighting Illini
Illinois Fighting Illini men's basketball seasons
1934 in sports in Illinois
1935 in sports in Illinois